Tranmere Rovers F.C. played the 1932–33 season in the Football League Third Division North. It was their 12th season of league football, and they finished 11th of 22. They reached the Fourth Round of the FA Cup.

Football League

References 

Tranmere Rovers F.C. seasons